Best Original Score is the name of an award which is presented by various film, television and theatre organizations, festivals, and people's awards. It may refer to:

 Academy Award for Best Original Score
 Academy of Canadian Cinema and Television Award for Best Achievement in Music – Original Score
 Golden Globe Award for Best Original Score
 Satellite Award for Best Original Score
 Tony Award for Best Original Score